KSRTC Bus Terminal Complex Thiruvalla is a transport hub in Thiruvalla town in the Indian state of Kerala, owned and operated by Kerala State Road Transport Corporation (KSRTC) under the depot code TVLA. It is located near the SCS Junction and is accessible via NH 183. It is one of the four BOT projects of KSRTC under KTDFC (Others are in Thampanoor, Kozhikode and Angamaly). Long distance intrastate, inter-state and city buses run regularly from the bus terminal.

History 
In 2006, the then Transport Minister and incumbent MLA of Thiruvalla, Mathew T. Thomas started a few bus terminal projects across the state. Work on the Thiruvalla terminal took off in August 2010. As part of this, KSRTC depot of Thiruvalla shifted operations temporarily to a ground near the Municipal Stadium. The project was a joint venture of Kerala State Road Transport Corporation and the Kerala Transport Development Finance Corporation (KTDFC) on Build–operate–transfer method. Mumbai-based Naresh builders undertook the project based on the design by the Thiruvananthapuram-based architect Koshy P. Alex of Vasthushilpalaya. KTDFC initially set the target completion date at August 31, 2013, However got delayed by two years due to political reasons. The project was completed and opened to public on June 6, 2015.

Overview 

The modern bus terminal-cum-shopping mall built at a cost of ₹41.38 crores is 12 storied and has a total plinth area of nearly 2 lakh sq ft. It features two basement floors exclusive for parking purposes and the ground floor acting as platforms. All other 9 elevated floors is designated for commercial purposes. Unlike the original plan, the top two floors have been made into two multiplexes. However, the complex is not centrally air-conditioned, making it less attractive for major business groups and commercial usage.

The bus terminal has 16 bus bays having a plinth area of 16,236 sq ft. The ground floor also has the KSRTC office, police aid-post, security personnel's room, cloak room, canteen and a few shops. A separate 4 storey building that houses garage, administrative office and retiring rooms for the staff is also constructed on the 2.96-acre premises. The terminal is now enabled with free public Wi-Fi access as part of the K-Fi project of the state government.

Platforms 

(also based on information collected on-site in 2022)

Gallery

See also
KSRTC
Transport in Kerala
Vyttila Mobility Hub
Thampanoor bus station
Pandalam KSRTC Bus Station
Thavakkara Bus Terminal Kannur

References 

Bus stations in Kerala
Buildings and structures in Pathanamthitta district
Transport in Pathanamthitta district
Bus stations in India